Avellino is a town and comune, capital of the province of Avellino in the Campania region of southern Italy.

History

Before the Roman conquest, the ancient Abellinum was a centre of the Samnite Hirpini, located on the Civita hill some  outside the current town, in what is now Atripalda. The city could correspond to the ancient Velecha, documented by coins found in the area. Abellinum was conquered by the Romans in 293 BC, changing name several times in the following centuries (Veneria, Livia, Augusta, Alexandriana, and Abellinatium). However, the construction of a true Roman town occurred only after the conquest by Lucius Cornelius Sulla in the civil wars in 89 BC. He razed the old site and in 82 BC founded the colony Veneria Abellinatium on the left bank of the river Sabato.

The new city was surrounded by massive walls and had an orthogonal hippodamian urban layout. In 7 AD Augustus changed its name to Livia Augusta in honour of his wife, Livia Drusilla who owned the territories between Abellinum and Aeclanum. In the 3rd century Alexander Severus expanded the colony under the title of Livia Augusta Alexandrina with a massive immigration of oriental settlers. This helped to spread ancient Levantine cults such as Sol Invictus in the territory.

There followed economic crises (III and IV centuries), violent earthquakes (346) and disastrous volcanic eruptions (472). The town was Christianised around 500, becoming an episcopal seat.

There were invasions of the Goths (535 - 555) and the Vandals. After the Lombard conquest of southern Italy, the ancient city was abandoned in 568 (it is disputed if completely or partly) and a new settlement grew on the Terra hill, corresponding to the modern Avellino.

Defended by a castle, it became part of the Duchy (later Principality) of Benevento and, after the latter's fall, of the Principality of Salerno. In 1100, during the Norman rule of southern Italy, it was acquired by Riccardo dell'Aquila. Later, King Charles I of Anjou assigned it to the Montfort  family, who were succeeded by the Del Balzo and the Filangieri.

The feudal rights to Avellino were purchased in 1581 by Don Marino I Caracciolo, duke of Atripalda, of a patrician family of Naples, who was made Prince of Avellino in 1589. Avellino became the main seat of the Caracciolo. Don Marino's son and grandson were consecutively Grand Chancellor of the Kingdom of Naples and chevaliers of the Order of the Golden Fleece. The grandson, Don Marino II (1587–1630), was the patron of Giambattista Basile, author of the Pentamerone.

In 1820 Avellino was seat of revolutionary riots. However, the Unification of Italy some fifty years later did not bring any benefit to the city, being cut off from the main railway line Naples-Benevento-Foggia, and far from the sea as well.

In 1943 the city was bombed by Allied planes in an attempt to cut off the retreat of German panzer units over the important Bridge of Ferriera.

Avellino has suffered from seismic activity throughout its history and was struck hard by the earthquakes of 23 November 1980 and 14 February 1981. Avellino has also received ashfall from numerous eruptions of Vesuvius which lies almost due west; the city sits on type locality of pumice deposited from a Plinian eruption of Vesuvius about 3800 years ago.

Government

Economy
The 1980 Irpinia earthquake represented a turning point for the town and for the entire province of Avellino. Large amounts of money flowed in for infrastructure investment, and the extra money generated innovation and economic expansion more generally. By 2008 a per capita annual income level of €20,180 placed Avellino well above the regional average in terms of individual prosperity.

Agriculture
Agriculture was at the heart of Avellino's economy until the mid-1970s, since then many younger people have moved away from family farms, and sometimes also migrated away from the area, in pursuit of higher wages. Nevertheless, tobacco, viticulture and especially the production of hazelnuts remain important to the local economy and, with increased investment in recent years, employ a number of people.

Industry
The manufacturing sector plays an important role in Avellino, with two industrial zones on the eastern and western peripheries of the main urban area, at Pianodardine suburb, Montefredane, Prata di Principato Ultra and Pratola Serra. Many small and medium-sized businesses are located in the industrial zones, including notably FMA (Fabbrica Motori Automobilistici, Automobile Engine Factory) who produces Fiat Pratola Serra modular engines for Fiat, Opel, Jeep, Lancia and Alfa Romeo, and creator of the "multi-jet" (fuel injected) car engine.

Transportation

Air
The nearest airports are those of Salerno-Pontecagnano,  to the southwest and  Napoli-Capodichino,  to the west.

Rail
The station, located where the city limits of Avellino meet Atripalda, was once the terminus for passenger rail services to Benevento, Cancello, and Rocchetta Sant'Antonio. The station provided a reliable link with Benevento and Salerno. A few long-distance trains to Naples and Rome were also added to try and reinvigorate the local economy, but these services came to an end in 2010, following cuts that saw the closure of the railway between Avellino and Rocchetta Sant'Antonio. A regional decree dated 9 August 2012 forced the closure of the remaining 19 local rail services.   However, in response to protests from rail users a small number of services were reinstated on 28 October 2012.

Road
Avellino is served by two access points (Avellino Est/East and Avellino Ovest/West) on the A16 Autostrada (originally numbered A17, and known also as "Autostrada of the two seas") which runs approximately west–east and links Naples to the west with Canosa di Puglia and Bari on the farther side of the country. Near Naples the A16 connects with the A3 Autostrada, ensuring good road access with the principal population centres across Italy. Also important is the so-called "Ofantina" superstrada (dual carriageway) linking with several locally important towns to the east and south, en route to Salerno.

Sport
 U.S. Avellino 1912, a football club based in the town
 S.S. Felice Scandone, a basketball club based in the town

Main sights

They include the forum, faced by temples, baths, parts of the Serino aqueduct and a patrician domus. There was also an amphitheatre and a brothel.

Avellino Cathedral, with its Romanesque crypt, stands on the site of a rich Roman villa which was built around 129 BC and abandoned after the eruption of Vesuvius, and an earthquake in 346 AD. The church and convent of Santa Maria delle Grazie were built in 1580.

There are some remains of the Lombard castle in Piazza Castello (Castle Square). Because the castle was built at the base of a small valley, its tactical purpose continues to puzzle modern-day historians throughout Europe.

The Fountain of Bellerophon was executed in the 17th century by Cosimo Fanzago.

Museums
 National Gallery of Selachoidei, housing one of the largest collections of cartilaginous fishes in Italy.
 Museum of Art (MdAO – Museo d'Arte)
 Museum of the Cathedral and the Diocese of Avellino
 Provincial Archaeological Museum
 Provincial Art Gallery, in the “Carcere Borbonico”
 Zoological Museum of invertebrates "L. Carbone”

People

 Sonia Aquino (1977 – ), actress
 Milly D'Abbraccio (1964 – ), pornographic film actress
 Luigi Di Maio (1986 – ), politician
 Carmine Biagio Gatti (1988 – ), footballer
 Carmen Giannattasio (1975 – ), operatic soprano
 Joe Grim (1881–1939), Italian American boxer
 Maurizio Lanzaro (1982 – ), footballer
 Antonio Maccanico (1924–2013), politician
 Gianfranco Rotondi (1960 – ), politician
 Ralph Sazio (1922–2008), Italian Canadian football player and coach
 Tony Soprano (1959-2007), fictional New Jersey mob boss
 Cesare Uva (1824–1886), painter

In fiction
In the HBO television series The Sopranos, mob boss Tony Soprano has his family roots in Avellino. Tony's grandfather, Corrado Soprano Sr, a stonemason, emigrated from Avellino to the United States in the early 20th century. In the episode "In Camelot", Corrado's son Junior Soprano claims "The whole village of Avellino settled in this area" in which the main characters live, in Essex County, New Jersey.

See also
 Avellino railway station
 Irpinia
 S.S. Felice Scandone, the town's basketball club, currently in Lega Basket Serie A
 Stadio Partenio-Adriano Lombardi
 U.S. Avellino 1912, the town's football club, currently in Serie C

Notes

Sources

External links

 Official website
 Il Magazine della città di Avellino

 
Cities and towns in Campania